Mikhail Grigoryevich Bondarenko (1912  8 November 1943) was a captain-lieutenant in Soviet Navy during World War II who was awarded the title Hero of the Soviet Union for his actions in the Kerch-Eltigen operation.

References 

1912 births
1943 deaths
Heroes of the Soviet Union
People from Kyiv Oblast
Recipients of the Order of Lenin
Recipients of the Order of the Red Banner
Soviet Navy personnel
Soviet military personnel killed in World War II
Soviet military personnel of World War II from Ukraine